Air Chief Marshal Sir Arthur Sheridan Barratt,  (25 February 1891 – 4 November 1966) was an officer in the Royal Flying Corps during the First World War and a senior commander in the Royal Air Force during the Second World War. He acquired the nickname "Ugly".

RAF career
Barratt was commissioned into the Royal Field Artillery in 1910 and transferred to the Royal Flying Corps in 1914. He served in the First World War, commanding No. 6 Squadron and then No. 49 Squadron before taking over 3rd (Corps) Wing. After the war he became Assistant Commandant at the Royal Air Force College Cranwell and then Staff Officer for Administration at Headquarters No. 3 Group. He was made Commandant at the School of Army Co-operation in 1926 and Air Staff Officer to the General Officer Commanding Shanghai in April 1927 before joining the Air Staff at Headquarters No. 22 Group in November 1927. He went on to be Chief Instructor at the RAF Staff College, Andover in 1929, Air Officer Commanding No. 1 (Indian) Group in 1931 and Senior Air Staff Officer at Headquarters RAF India in 1932. After that he was Director of Staff Duties at the Air Ministry in 1935 and then returned to the RAF Staff College, Andover, as Commandant in 1936.

He served in the Second World War as Principal RAF Liaison Officer to the French Air Force and then Air Officer Commanding-in-Chief British Air Forces in France. When he heard that on 14 May 1940, forty of the seventy-one British bombers that had taken off did not return, he is said to have cried. He continued his war service as Air Officer Commanding-in-Chief at Army Co-operation Command in November 1940 and Air Officer Commanding-in-Chief at Technical Training Command in 1943. His last appointment was as Inspector-General of the RAF in 1945, in which capacity he took part in the Victory Parade in June 1946 before retiring in 1947.

References

 

|-
 

|-

Royal Air Force air marshals
1891 births
1966 deaths
Royal Field Artillery officers
People educated at Clifton College
Knights Commander of the Order of the Bath
Companions of the Order of St Michael and St George
Recipients of the Military Cross
Officers of the Order of the Crown (Belgium)
Recipients of the Croix de Guerre 1939–1945 (France)
Recipients of the Croix de guerre (Belgium)
Grand Croix of the Légion d'honneur
Commanders with Star of the Order of Polonia Restituta
Aviation pioneers
Royal Flying Corps officers
Graduates of the Royal Military Academy, Woolwich
Deputy Lieutenants of Hampshire
Military personnel of British India